Marco Condemi (born 13 October 1995) is an Italian football player who plays for Palmese in Serie D.

Club career
He made his Serie B debut for Reggina on 17 May 2014 in a game against Cesena.

References

External links
 
 

1995 births
People from Gioia Tauro
Footballers from Calabria
Living people
Italian footballers
Reggina 1914 players
Serie B players
Serie C players
Serie D players
Association football midfielders
Sportspeople from the Metropolitan City of Reggio Calabria